Stachytarpheta indica is a species of plant in the family Verbenaceae, native to the tropical Americas. It has often been included in the species S. jamaicensis.

References

indica